The (Roman) Catholic Church in Montenegro only comprises two Latin dioceses, one of which is an exempt archdiocese, which has no ecclesiastical province.

It has no national episcopal conference, but its episcopate partakes in the Balkanic International Episcopal Conference of Saints Cyril and Methodius, jointly with fellow former-Yugoslavian Balkanic countries Kosovo, Macedonia and Serbia (not Croatia or Slovenia, which have a national conference each).

There is no Eastern Catholic or pre-diocesan jurisdiction.

There is also an Apostolic Nunciature to Montenegro as papal diplomatic representation (embassy level), which is however vested in the Apostolic Nunciature to Bosnia and Herzegovina (in its capital Sarajevo).

Current Latin dioceses 
 Roman Catholic Archdiocese of Bar, now non-Metropolitan and Exempt, i.e. immediately subject to the Holy See
 Roman Catholic Diocese of Kotor, suffragan of the (Croatian) Metropolitan Roman Catholic Archdiocese of Split–Makarska

Titular sees 
All six defunct dioceses in Montenegro have been nominally restored as Latin Titular sees :

 A Metropolitan Titular archbishopric 
 Doclea

 Five Titular bishoprics  
 Budua
 (Herceg) Novi
 Risinium (Risinio)
 Suacia (Svač)
 Ulcinj (Dulcigno, Ulcinium).

See also 
 List of Catholic dioceses (structured view)
 Catholic Church in Montenegro#History
 Catholic Church in Montenegro#Organisation

Sources and external links 
 GCatholic 

Montenegro
Catholic dioceses